Jamie Patrick Booth (born 14 September 1994) is a New Zealand rugby union player who currently plays as a halfback, Wing for the Hurricanes in Super Rugby and  in the Mitre 10 Cup.

He has also played for the Highlanders. Booth made his debut on 2 July 2016 against the Southern Kings coming on as a substitute.

Booth had a stint in England playing for Newcastle Falcons.

During the 2015 Super Rugby season he was called into the  squad as an injury replacement for Bryn Hall, however he didn't make any appearances.

References

1994 births
Living people
New Zealand rugby union players
Rugby union scrum-halves
Manawatu rugby union players
People educated at Palmerston North Boys' High School
Rugby union players from Palmerston North
Highlanders (rugby union) players
Newcastle Falcons players
New Zealand expatriate rugby union players
Expatriate rugby union players in England
New Zealand expatriate sportspeople in England
Sunwolves players
Hurricanes (rugby union) players
North Harbour rugby union players